Tool of the Man is the third album by American alternative rock band Poster Children,  released in 1993. The title of the album comes from graffiti written in dust on the band's van during the South by Southwest Festival: "Poster Children, Band of the Year, Tool of the Man."  The album art consists of several optical illusions, including an afterimage of the United States flag on the front cover.

Critical reception
Trouser Press wrote: "Far from acting like tools of the man, Poster Children opt for an even less homogenized approach: sugar-free rockers mixed with knottier, more experimental mood pieces."

Track listing
 "Dynamite Chair" – 3:01
 "Tommyhaus" – 3:26
 "In My Way" – 5:07
 "Clock Street" – 4:17
 "Redline" – 5:20
 "Shotguns & Pickups" – 2:32
 "Blatant Dis" – 3:56
 "Idiot Show" – 4:19
 "Outside In" – 3:30
 "Three Bullets" – 5:48

Personnel
Rick Valentin – Vocals, Guitar
Rose Marshack – Bass, vocals
Jim Valentin – Guitar
John Herndon – Drums

Credits
Mike McMackin – Producer, Engineer

Notes

1993 albums
Poster Children albums
Sire Records albums